Hell's Winter is the second solo studio album by American rapper Cage. It was released by Definitive Jux on September 20, 2005. It peaked at number 26 on the Billboard Heatseekers Albums chart, as well as number 36 on the Independent Albums chart.

Critical reception

Tom Breihan of Pitchfork gave the album an 8.3 out of 10, calling it "a harrowing ride on which Cage describes his childhood in fractured blips of vivid images instead of broad, sweeping statements." Ross McGowan of Stylus Magazine gave the album a grade of B−, saying, "Hell's Winter has its moments, but while the production is noteworthy, the actual songs within are rather hit or miss."

Exclaim! named it the 9th best hip hop album of 2005. In 2010, Rhapsody included it on the "10 Best Albums by White Rappers" list.

Track listing

Personnel
Credits adapted from liner notes.

 Cage – vocals
 El-P – vocals (11), production (1, 2, 4, 5, 8, 9, 13, 14)
 Matt Sweeney – guitar (1)
 James McNew – bass guitar (1, 5)
 Blockhead – production (2, 5, 7)
 Jello Biafra – vocals (3)
 DJ Shadow – production (3)
 Camu Tao – vocals (4), production (4, 8, 11, 12)
 Daryl Palumbo – vocals (6)
 RJD2 – production (6)
 Pawl – production (10)
 Aesop Rock – vocals (11)
 Tame One – vocals (11)
 Yak Ballz – vocals (11)
 Nasa – recording
 Joey Raia – mixing
 Ken Heitmueller – mastering
 Kiku – artwork, design
 Nairobi Morgan – photography

Charts

References

External links
 
 

2005 albums
Cage (rapper) albums
Definitive Jux albums
Albums produced by DJ Shadow
Albums produced by El-P
Albums produced by RJD2
Albums produced by Blockhead (music producer)